The 2016 Punjab State Super Football League was the 30th season of the Punjab State Super Football League. The season began on 11 September 2016 and concluded on 19 October 2016.

The first match took place between Jangpur and Punjab Police. The match ended 2–2.

Teams
 Border Security Force (Jalandhar)
 Central Reserve Police Force (Jalandhar)
 Dailbir FA (Patiala)
 Doaba
 Gurur (Jalandhar)
 Jagat Singh Palahi
 Jangpur
 Punjab Police (Jalandhar)
 Punjab State Power Corporation Limited (Hoshiarpur)
 Rail Coach Factory (Kapurthala)
 Satluj

Table

References

Punjab State Super Football League
2016–17 in Indian football leagues